The Czech Pirate Party leadership election of 2012 was held on 25 August 2012. Ivan Bartoš was reelected when he defeated Petr Bajgar. Bajgar was nominated by South Moravian Piraret.

Voting
Bartoš received 57 votes while Bajgar only 14.

References

Czech Pirate Party leadership elections
Pirate Party leadership election
Czech Pirate Party leadership election
Czech Pirate Party leadership election